Samuel Herbertson (1889 – 12 July 1915) was a Scottish professional footballer who played in the Scottish League for Ayr United as a goalkeeper.

Personal life 
Soon after the outbreak of the First World War in August 1914, Herbertson enlisted as a private in the Royal Scots Fusiliers. He was killed in action at Gallipoli on 12 July 1915 and is commemorated on the Helles Memorial.

References 

1889 births
1915 deaths
Scottish footballers
British Army personnel of World War I
British military personnel killed in World War I
Ayr United F.C. players
Footballers from Irvine, North Ayrshire
Association football goalkeepers
Royal Scots Fusiliers soldiers
Scottish Football League players
Beith F.C. players